Lhotka is a municipality and village in Přerov District in the Olomouc Region of the Czech Republic. It has about 80 inhabitants. The historic part of the village is well preserved and is protected by law as a village monument zone.

Sights
In the village centre there is the Chapel of the Holy Guardian Angels and a statue of the Virgin Mary with Jesus.

References

Villages in Přerov District